Love Confessions is the second studio album by American R&B singer Miki Howard, released in 1987 via Atlantic Records. It peaked at No. 145 on the Billboard 200 and No. 13 on the Billboard Top R&B Albums chart.

The album's first two singles, "Baby, Be Mine" and "That's What Love Is", were R&B hits, peaking at No. 5 and No. 4, respectively, on the Billboard Hot Black Singles chart. The third single, "Crazy", reached No. 38 on the same chart.

Critical reception
The Rolling Stone Album Guide wrote that Love Confessions "works best when Howard emphasizes the jazzier side of her sound." The Gazette called the album "superior late-night couch-crawling soul."

Track listing

Notes
"Edge of Love" also appears on the 1987 film soundtrack Fatal Beauty, starring actress-comedian Whoopi Goldberg.

Credits and personnel
Executive-Producer – Sylvia Rhone, Bob Merlin, and Miki Howard
Producers — Nick Martinelli, Arif Mardin, LeMel Humes, Gerald Levert and Marc GordonPeter Lord, V. Jeffrey Smith, David Kitay, Steve Tyrell 
Mastered [Production] – Dennis King 
Mastered [CD] – Stephen Innocenzi

Charts

Weekly charts

Singles

References

External links
mikihowardmedia.com

1987 albums
Miki Howard albums
Albums produced by LeMel Humes
Atlantic Records albums